The 2018 Lower Austrian state election was held on 28 January 2018 to elect the members of the Landtag of Lower Austria.

The ruling Austrian People's Party (ÖVP) fell just short of an absolute majority of votes, but retained its majority in the Landtag. Nonetheless, this was its worst result in the state since 1998. The Social Democratic Party of Austria (SPÖ) and Freedom Party of Austria (FPÖ) made gains, with the latter doubling its share of seats. The Greens took minor losses, while NEOS – The New Austria (NEOS) contested its first state election in Lower Austria, debuting at 5.2%. Team Stronach, which had won 9.8% in the previous election, did not compete.

Background
The Lower Austrian constitution mandates that cabinet positions in the state government (state councillors) be allocated between parties proportionally in accordance with the share of votes won by each; this is known as Proporz. As such, the government is a perpetual coalition of all parties that qualify for at least one state councillor. After the 2013 election, the ÖVP had six councillors, the SPÖ two, and Team Stronach one.

Electoral system
The 56 seats of the Landtag of Lower Austria are elected via open list proportional representation in a two-step process. The seats are distributed between twenty multi-member constituencies. For parties to receive any representation in the Landtag, they must either win at least one seat in a constituency directly, or clear a 4 percent state-wide electoral threshold. Seats are distributed in constituencies according to the Hare quota, with any remaining seats allocated using the D'Hondt method at the state level, to ensure overall proportionality between a party's vote share and its share of seats.

Contesting parties
The table below lists parties represented in the previous Landtag.

Team Stronach, which contested the previous election and won 9.8% of votes, five seats, and one state councillor, did not contest the 2018 election.

In addition to the parties already represented in the Landtag, four parties collected enough signatures to be placed on the ballot.

 NEOS – The New Austria (NEOS)
 Christian Party of Austria (CPÖ) – on the ballot only in Amstetten, Melk, and Mödling
 We for Lower Austria (WFNOE) – on the ballot only in Baden

Opinion polling

Results

Results by constituency

Preference votes
Alongside votes for a party, voters were able to cast a preferential votes for a candidate on the party list. The ten candidates with the most preferential votes were as follows:

Aftermath
The ÖVP retained its Landtag majority and six out of nine state councillors; the SPÖ also retained its two councillors. With the disappearance of Team Stronach, the FPÖ moved into third place on a strong swing, and won one state councillor.

Notes

References

2018 elections in Austria
State elections in Austria
January 2018 events in Austria